Scymnus mimoides, is a species of beetle found in the family Coccinellidae. It is found in North America.

References 

Beetles described in 1976
Coccinellidae